The Asia Tour was planned to be the eleventh concert tour by Canadian singer Celine Dion. The tour was organized to support her eleventh English-language and twenty-fifth studio album, Loved Me Back to Life (2013), and was scheduled to take place in October and November 2014. The tour would have marked Dion's first concerts in Asia since the Taking Chances World Tour in 2008. While Japan and the Philippines were the only confirmed countries, it was revealed that the singer planned to perform in several other Asian countries for the first time.

Background
The tour was organized to support the English language album Loved Me Back to Life, and was scheduled to take place in October and November 2014. Japan and the Philippines were officially announced. However, local media in Taiwan revealed that Dion was slated to begin the tour in Taipei.

Commercial performance
The concerts in Tokyo and Osaka sold out immediately after tickets went on sale.

Cancellation
On 13 August 2014, Dion has announced that the tour has been cancelled due to ongoing illness and family issues.

According to a statement released by the singer:

 Dion did not return to Asia for a performance until her 2018 tour.

Opening acts
In the official announcement for the Japan and Philippine tour, it was revealed that the impersonator Véronic DiCaire had been invited to join Celine as the opening act for these shows.

Set list
The official setlist had yet to be announced, although in an exclusive video message to her Japanese fans, Dion promised a new show featuring songs from her latest English album, Loved Me Back to Life, as well as fan favorites from the past. Celine was also rehearsing one song in Japanese and one in Mandarin for the tour.

Cancelled tour dates

Notes
A The concert of 29 October 2014 at Taipei Arena was never formally announced prior to the tour cancellation.
B The concert of 26 November 2014 at Solaire Resort & Casino is only open to selected guests.

References

2014 concert tours
Celine Dion concert tours
Cancelled concert tours